Sphenomorphus haasi  is a species of skink. It is endemic to Borneo and found in Malaysia and Indonesia.

References

haasi
Reptiles of Borneo
Endemic fauna of Borneo
Reptiles of Indonesia
Reptiles of Malaysia
Reptiles described in 1965
Taxa named by Robert F. Inger
Taxa named by William Hosmer (herpetologist)